The 1959 NBA World Championship Series was the championship series of the 1958–59 National Basketball Association season, and was the conclusion of the 1959 NBA Playoffs. The best-of-seven series was played between the Western Division champion Minneapolis Lakers and the Eastern Division champion Boston Celtics. It was Boston's third trip to the NBA Finals and Minneapolis's sixth. The Boston Celtics swept the Lakers 4–0. That was the start of the skein of the Celtics' eight consecutive championships, from 1959–1966. To date, this is the most recent time that an NBA team from Minnesota appeared in an NBA Finals, as well as the first of two times in NBA history that a team with a losing record made the NBA Finals (the other was in 1981).

Series summary 

Celtics win series 4–0

Team rosters

Boston Celtics
 6 Russell 
 14 Cousy 
 15 Heinsohn 
 16 Swain
 17 Conley 
 18 Loscutoff
 21 Sharman
 23 Ramsey
 24 S. Jones
 25 K. Jones
 29 Tsioropoulos
 Head coach: Auerbach

Minneapolis Lakers
 14 Foust
 16 Garmaker
 19 Mikkelsen
 21 Leonard
 22 Baylor
 23 Ellis
 30 Hamilton
 32 Krebs
 33 Hundley
 50 Fleming
 Coach Kundla

External links
NBA History

Finals
National Basketball Association Finals
NBA
NBA
April 1959 sports events in the United States
Basketball competitions in Minneapolis
Basketball competitions in Boston
1950s in Boston
1950s in Minneapolis
NBA Finals
NBA Finals